Jizhao is an unclassified Kra-Dai language spoken in Jizhao Village 吉兆村, Tanba Town 覃巴镇, Wuchuan, Guangdong. It may be most closely related to Be. In Wuchuan, Jizhao is locally referred to as Haihua 海话, which is the term used elsewhere in Leizhou 雷州, Xuwen 徐闻, and Maoming 茂名 to refer to the local Minnan Chinese dialect of Leizhou.
The speakers are being subsumed under "Han Chinese" nationality in census.

Demographics
Jizhao has speakers above the age of 60 (Shao 2016:70). Within Jizhao Administrative Village 吉兆行政村, it is spoken in the hamlets (natural villages) of Jizhao 吉兆, Meilou 梅楼, and Hong 洪村 villages (Shao 2016:9). All of Jizhao speakers are being counted as part of Han nationality.

As of 2017, there are fewer than 100 speakers of Jizhao, most of whom are above the age of 70.

Classification
Shao & Meng (2016) observe some similarities with the Be language of northern Hainan, but provisionally consider Jizhao to be unclassified within the Kam-Tai (壮侗) branch. Jizhao has many loanwords from Yue Chinese and Minnan Chinese.

Weera Ostapirat (1998), analyzing data from Zhang (1992), notes that Be and Jizhao share many lexical similarities and sound correspondences, and that Jizhao may be a remnant Be-related language on the Chinese mainland.

In a 100-item Swadesh list, Shao (2016) found lexical matches between Jizhao and the following languages.
Ong Be: 56 words
Zhuang: 6 words
Yue Chinese: 7 words
Min Chinese: 1 word
No parallels: 30 words

Phonology
Jizhao has 6 tones (Shao 2016:15).
 21
 31
 32
 33
 55
 45

Jizhao, like Hlai, also has the implosive consonants /ɓ/ and /ɗ/ (Li & Wu 2017).

See also
Jizhao Swadesh list (Wiktionary)

References

Sources
Li, Jian [李健]. 2011. Guangdong Wuchuan Jizhao Haihua de si zhong yuyan chengfen 广东吴川吉兆海话的四种语音成分 / Four Speech Sounds in the Jizhao Hai Dialect of Guangdong's Wuchuan. In Journal of Zhanjiang Normal College [湛江师范学院学报] 2011(4).
Li, Jinfang [李锦芳]; Wu Yan [吴艳]. 2017. "Guangdong Wuchuan Jizhaohua gaikuang " [广东吴川吉兆话概况]. In Minzu Yuwen  [民族语文] 2017:4.
Shao, Lanzhu [邵兰珠]. 2016. Guangdong Jizhaohua yanjiu [广东吉兆话研究]. M.A. dissertation: Guangxi University for Nationalities [广西民族大学].
Shao, Lanzhu [邵兰珠]; Meng Yuanyao [蒙元耀]. 2016. "Loanwords of Min dialect in Jizhao dialect in Guangdong" [广东吉兆话中的闽方言借词]. In Journal of Guangdong University of Petrochemical Technology [广东石油化工学院学报], Vol. 26, No. 2, April 2016.
Zhang, Zhenxing [张振兴]. 1992. "Guangdongsheng Wuchuan fangyan jilve" [广东省吴川方言记略]. In Fangyan [方言] 1992(3).

External links
奇特的吴川吉兆话 
李锦芳教授：“濒危语言吉兆话研究”  

Kra–Dai languages
Languages of China